Miasma is the second studio album by American melodic death metal band The Black Dahlia Murder.  Released through Metal Blade Records on July 12, 2005, Miasma is the only album to feature drummer Zach Gibson, who replaced founding member and drummer, Cory Grady, as well as being the last with bassist David Lock. Gibson also left the band the following year after the release of the album and was replaced by Shannon Lucas, formerly of All That Remains.

The album's title, Miasma, refers to Miasma theory. The track "Dave Goes to Hollywood" was originally entitled "Vice Campaign". Music videos were released for the tracks "Statutory Ape", "A Vulgar Picture", and "Miasma".

Track listing

Personnel
The Black Dahlia Murder
Trevor Strnad - vocals
Brian Eschbach - guitars
John Kempainen - guitars
 David Lock - bass
 Zach Gibson - drums

Additional personnel
 Garrett Gross, Randy Vanderbilt and The Black Dahlia Murder - backing vocals
 Amber Blankenship - cello

Production
Produced by Andreas Magnuson, Chris Dowhan and The Black Dahlia Murder
Brian Slagel - executive producer

Chart positions

References

2005 albums
The Black Dahlia Murder (band) albums
Metal Blade Records albums